The list of non-Arab Sahaba includes non-Arabs among the original Sahaba of the Islamic prophet Muhammad. Muhammad had many followers from amongst the Arabs, from many different tribes. However, he also had many non-Arab Sahaba, from many different ethnicities. Some of these non-Arabs were among the most beloved and loyal individuals to Muhammad. The inclusion of these non-Arabs among the original followers of Muhammad and Islam represents the universality of the message of Islam.

Classical Sources

Afro-Arabs

 Bilal ibn Rabah, First Muezzin (Reciter of the Adhan) in history. He was born into slavery but was emancipated by the Muslims.
 Wahshi ibn Harb was an Abyssinian who killed Hamza ibn Abdul-Muttalib in the Battle of Uhud before accepting Islam and then later reportedly killed Musaylima in the Ridda Wars.
 Umm Ayman (Barakah), was around Muhammad from his birth until his death and was the closest example of a mother to him (after his own mother’s death when he was a child). She was the mother of Usama ibn Zayd and Ayman ibn Ubayd.
 Ayman ibn Ubayd, son of Umm Ayman and half-brother of Usama ibn Zayd. Ayman was killed fighting in the Battle of Hunayn. 
 Usama ibn Zayd, son of Umm Ayman. Prominent general in the early Muslim Caliphate. 
Sumayyah bint Khabbat, one of the first to embrace Islam and later on get killed by the polytheistic Banu Makhzum because of her faith. She is described in the sources as being black-skinned. The sources assume she was of Ethiopian origin.

Persian
 Salman al-Farsi – He was born as a Zoroastrian in Persia but embarked on a long and continuous journey (away from his homeland) in search of the truth. He ultimately reached his destination in Arabia, when he met Muhammad and converted to Islam. It was his suggestion to build a trench in the Battle of the Trench that ultimately resulted in a defeat for the forces of the enemies of the Muslims.
 Fayruz al-Daylami – A member of Al-Abnāʾ in Yemen, he was sent out by Muhammad to defeat Aswad Ansi, who claimed prophethood in Yemen.
 Munabbih ibn Kamil – He was a Persian knight. He had two sons, who were both Islamic scholars.
 Salim Mawla Abu-Hudhayfah – He was a highly respected and valued Muslim (among his fellow Muslims), who died while fighting against the forces of Musaylimah during the Wars of Apostasy. Umar ibn al-Khattāb suggested he would have designated Salim as his successor to the Caliphate had he still been alive.

Roman
 Al-Nahdiah, converted to Islam while she was a slave, but refused to abandon her new faith even after being tortured and persecuted by her slave-master. She was later freed from slavery.
 Lubaynah, converted to Islam while she was a slave, but refused to abandon her new faith even after being persecuted by her then pagan slave-master. She was later freed from slavery.
 Umm Ubays, converted to Islam while she was a slave, but refused to abandon her new faith even after being tortured and persecuted by her pagan slave-master. She was later freed from slavery. She was the daughter of Al-Nahdiah.
 Harithah bint al-Muammil (Zunayra) – Converted to Islam while she was a slave, but refused to abandon her new faith even after being persecuted to such a severe extent that she lost her eyesight. She was later freed from slavery. Umm Ubays was her sister.
 Suhayb the Roman – Former slave in the Byzantine Empire who went on to become a companion of Muhammad and member of the early Muslim community. He served as the caretaker of the caliphate and the imam of the Muslims in prayer while Umar I was on his deathbed until the nomination of his successor, Uthman ibn Affan. Although his name had the title, "the Roman," he was only culturally Roman due to growing up there, but ethnically he was born Arab.

Copt (Egyptian)
 Maria al-Qibtiyya – Was a slave who went on to become one of Muhammad's wives, she was the mother of Muhammad's third son Ibrahim.
 Sirin – Was the wife of Hassan ibn Thabit, who was one of the best Arab poets of the time. Maria al-Qibtiyya was her sister.

Kurd
 Jaban al-Kurdi – He was known to have narrated 10 prophetic ahadith

Jewish
 Abdullah ibn Salam – Was a rabbi before his conversion to Islam. He was the first Muslim that was explicitly promised Jannah (paradise) by Muhammad, while he was still alive. He is credited as the man who participated in most battles during the Prophet's time. He was an expert in reading Hebrew bible, his mother tongue, and he was assigned by the Prophet to document Quran.
 Mukhayriq-was a rabbi who lived in Medina and fought alongside Muhammad in the Battle of Uhud
 Safiyya bint Huyayy – She was one of Muhammad's wives.
 Rayhana – Also one of Muhammad's wives.

Assyrian
 Khabbab ibn al-Aratt – One of the first converts to Islam, he was a Chaldean from the Yamama region.
 Addas – He was a young Christian slave boy (originally from Nineveh) who was the first person from Taif to convert to Islam.

Alleged according to Local Legend

Comorian

Fey Bedja Mwamba – According to Comorian legend, he was a Comorian noble who brought Islam to the Comoros Islands visiting Mecca during Muhammad’s lifetime where he converted to Islam.
Mtswa Mwandze – According to Comorian legend, he was a Comorian noble who brought Islam to the Comoros Islands visiting Mecca during Muhammad’s lifetime where he converted to Islam.

Indian
 Cheraman Perumal, Chera king of Kerala, South Western India (present-day Kerala) who traveled to Arabia and converted to Islam.
Baba Ratan Al-Hindi, a Punjabi trader who used to take goods from India to Arabia.

Pashtun

 Qais Abdur Rashid (also known as Imraul Qais Khan), legendary and possibly fictional ancestor of the Pashtuns, who traveled from Zhob (present day Baluchistan, Pakistan) to Arabia to meet Muhammad and there embraced Islam, before returning to his people and introducing them to the faith.

Kurdish 
 Jaban al-Kurdi – He was better known as Jaban Al-Kurdi. In the year 18 after Hijra, he went back to Middle East to preach Islam in his homeland.

See also
 Al-Najashi – He was the king of the Kingdom of Aksum who allowed a number of Muslims (who were being persecuted by the pagans of Arabia) to live safely under his protection in his kingdom. He later converted to Islam and when he died, Muhammad observed prayer in absentia for him.
 Badhan (Persian Governor) – He was the Sassanid Persian Governor of Yemen who converted to Islam after one of Muhammad's prophecies was proven to be correct. As a result, every Persian in Yemen followed his example and also converted to Islam. The first mosque outside Arabia was ordered to be built by him in the Persian port city of Cylan.

References

Sahaba, non-Arab
Sahaba, non-Arab

Medieval Islamic world-related lists